Tsendiin Damdin (March 31, 1957 – February 22, 2018) was a Mongolian wrestler who represented his country in sambo and judo. At the 1980 Summer Olympics he won the silver medal in the men's Half Lightweight (65 kg) category. In 1979 he won gold medal at World Sambo Championships in lightweight category.

References

External links
 

1957 births
2018 deaths
People from Khentii Province
Mongolian male judoka
Judoka at the 1980 Summer Olympics
Olympic judoka of Mongolia
Olympic silver medalists for Mongolia
Olympic medalists in judo
Medalists at the 1980 Summer Olympics
20th-century Mongolian people
21st-century Mongolian people